The Wilmot-Horton executive council was first executive council of British Ceylon. The government was led by Governor Robert Wilmot-Horton.

Executive council members

See also
 Cabinet of Sri Lanka

Notes

References

1833 establishments in Ceylon
1837 disestablishments in Ceylon
Cabinets established in 1833
Cabinets disestablished in 1837
Ceylonese executive councils
Ministries of Queen Victoria
Ministries of William IV of the United Kingdom